The 2020–21 season is Ergotelis' 91st season in existence and 14th overall in the second tier of the Greek football league system, and second after the foundation of the Super League 2. The contents of this article cover club activities from 1 July 2020 until 30 May 2021.

The season began for the club in January 2021, after a lengthy postponement of the Super League 2 championship due to the ongoing COVID-19 pandemic. As a result, Ergotelis, along with all other clubs participating in the competition, were excluded from participation in this year's edition of the Greek Football Cup, which was held only with the 14 teams participating in the Super League.

After overcoming a slow start with two losses in the first two games, Ergotelis impressed with performances during the First round of the tournament, where the team went 7-1-0 over the next 8 games. After a sluggish start to the Second round, Ergotelis entered the Promotion Play-offs in 4th place. The club won all its playoffs matches against fellow promotion contenders, until eventually going down 2−1 vs. Ionikos in the final match of the season, finishing in 4th place. The game raised much controversy due to the presence of Ionikos fans at Neapoli Stadium despite lockdown regulations, as well as questionable decisions by referee Vasilios Fotias late in the game.

Players

The following players have departed in mid-season 

Note: Flags indicate national team as has been defined under FIFA eligibility rules. Players and Managers may hold more than one non-FIFA nationality.

Transfers

In

Promoted from youth system

Re-signings

Out

Transfer summary
Undisclosed fees are not included in the transfer totals.

Expenditure

Summer:  €0,000

Winter:  €0,000

Total:  €0,000

Income

Summer:  €0,000

Winter:  €0,000

Total:  €0,000

Net totals

Summer:  €0,000

Winter:  €0,000

Total:  €0,000

Kit
2020−21

|
|Variations

|Friendlies

|
|

Preseason and friendlies

Preseason friendlies

Competitions

Overview 

Last updated: 19 May 2021

Super League 2

Regular season

League table

Results summary

Results by Round

Matches 

1. Matchday 2 vs. Doxa Drama, originally scheduled for 20 January 2021 was postponed as a result of the Greek Professional Sports Committee not granting Doxa Drama a certificate for participating in the Super League 2.

Play-off Round

League table

Results summary

Results by Round

Matches

Statistics

Squad statistics 

! colspan="9" style="background:#DCDCDC; text-align:center" | Goalkeepers
|-

! colspan="9" style="background:#DCDCDC; text-align:center" | Defenders
|-

! colspan="9" style="background:#DCDCDC; text-align:center" | Midfielders
|-

! colspan="9" style="background:#DCDCDC; text-align:center" | Forwards
|-

! colspan="9" style="background:#DCDCDC; text-align:center" | Players transferred/loaned out during the season
|-

|}

Goal scorers 

Last updated: 19 May 2021
Source: Competitive matches

Disciplinary record 

Last updated: 19 May 2021
Source: Competitive matches
 = Number of bookings;  = Number of sending offs after a second yellow card;  = Number of sending offs by a direct red card.

Injury record

References 

Ergotelis
Ergotelis F.C. seasons